= Bibliography of Germany =

Germany

This is a list of books in the English language which deal with Germany and its geography, history, inhabitants, culture, biota, etc.

- Algan, Yann, et al. "The economic situation of first and second-generation immigrants in France, Germany and the United Kingdom." (2010): F4-F30. online
- Dustmann, Christian, et al. "From sick man of Europe to economic superstar: Germany's resurgent economy." Journal of economic perspectives 28.1 (2014): 167–188. online
- Fulbrook, Mary (1991). A Concise History of Germany. Cambridge University Press. ISBN 978-0-521-36836-0.
- Funk, Nanette. "A spectre in Germany: refugees, a ‘welcome culture’ and an ‘integration politics’." in Refugee Crisis (Routledge, 2018) pp. 44-54. online
- Grix, Jonathan, and Barrie Houlihan. "Sports mega-events as part of a nation's soft power strategy: The cases of Germany (2006) and the UK (2012)." British journal of politics and international relations 16.4 (2014): 572–596. online
- Haas, Tobias. "From green energy to the green car state? The political economy of ecological modernisation in Germany." New political economy 26.4 (2021): 660–673.
- Hardach, Karl. The political economy of Germany in the twentieth century (Univ of California Press, 2022).
- Hearnden, Arthur. Education, Culture, and Politics in West Germany (Elsevier, 2014).
- Jackson, Gregory, and Arndt Sorge. "The trajectory of institutional change in Germany, 1979–2009." in Changing Models of Capitalism in Europe and the US (Routledge, 2016) pp. 38–59 online.
- Large, David Clay (2007). Nazi Games: The Olympics of 1936. W. W. Norton & Company. ISBN 978-0-393-05884-0.
- Samuel, Richard H., and R. Hinton Thomas. Education and society in modern Germany (Routledge, 2013).
- Schlösser, Hans Jürgen, Michael Schuhen, and Susanne Schürkmann. "The acceptance of the social market economy in Germany." Citizenship, Social and Economics Education 16.1 (2017): 3–18. online
- Shen, Lihua, and Yanran Hong. "Can geopolitical risks excite Germany economic policy uncertainty: Rethinking in the context of the Russia-Ukraine conflict." Finance Research Letters 51 (2023): 103420. online
- Sleifer, Jaap. Planning ahead and falling behind: the East German economy in comparison with West Germany 1936-2002 (Walter de Gruyter 2014). online
- Triadafilopoulos, Triadafilos. Becoming multicultural: Immigration and the politics of membership in Canada and Germany (UBC Press, 2012) online.
